Germán Eduardo Muñoz Ormeño (born 23 June 1973) is a Peruvian footballer who played as a midfielder. He made nine appearances for the Peru national team from 1994 to 1997. He was also part of Peru's squad for the 1997 Copa América tournament.

References

External links
 

1973 births
Living people
Footballers from Lima
Peruvian footballers
Association football midfielders
Peru international footballers
Club Universitario de Deportes footballers
Cienciano footballers
Sport Boys footballers
Estudiantes de Medicina footballers
Alianza Atlético footballers
Unión Huaral footballers